Gyula Szilágyi (18 January 1923 – 17 October 2001) was a Hungarian footballer who played as a forward. He was the top scorer of the Hungarian league in 1957.

Honours
Vasas SC
Nemzeti Bajnokság I: 1957
Hungarian Cup: 1955
Mitropa Cup: 1956, 1957, 1960

References

External links
 
 

1923 births
2001 deaths
Sportspeople from Debrecen
Association football forwards
Hungarian footballers
Hungary international footballers
Nemzeti Bajnokság I players
Vasas SC players